Leptonectes is a genus of ichthyosaur that lived in the Late Triassic to Early Jurassic (Rhaetian - Pliensbachian). Fossils have been found in Belgium, Germany, Switzerland, Spain and the United Kingdom.

See also

 List of ichthyosaurs
 Timeline of ichthyosaur research

References

Prehistoric life of Europe
Rhaetian first appearances
Late Triassic ichthyosaurs
Early Jurassic ichthyosaurs
Early Jurassic extinctions
Ichthyosauromorph genera